Tricypha proxima is a moth in the subfamily Arctiinae. It was described by Augustus Radcliffe Grote in 1867. It is found on Cuba.

References

Moths described in 1867
Phaegopterina
Moths of the Caribbean
Endemic fauna of Cuba